Lemarchand may refer to:

 François Lemarchand, (b. 1960), French cyclist
 Håvard Jørgensen, Norwegian musician
 Lemarchand's box, a fictional lock puzzle or puzzle box
 René Lemarchand, (b. 1932), French political scientist
 Romain Lemarchand, (b. 1987), French cyclist, son of François